Kharino is a rural locality (a settlement) in Gaynskoye Rural Settlement, Gaynsky District, Perm Krai, Russia. The population was 823 as of 2010. There are 16 streets.

Geography 
Kharino is located 7 km southeast of Gayny (the district's administrative centre) by road. Danilovo is the nearest rural locality.

References 

Rural localities in Gaynsky District